Giorgio Bulgari (born 1977) is an entrepreneur and a member of the Bulgari family of jewelers.

Early life and career 
Bulgari was born in New York and raised in Rome. He is the great-grandson of Sotirio Bulgari, founder of the jewelry and luxury goods brand Bulgari and son of Gianni Bulgari.

Bulgari was a creative director of the Italian jewelry house Marina B, who extended the heritage of the brand founded by his aunt Marina Bulgari. Prior to joining Marina B, Bulgari had been a consultant for Italian luxury goods company Salvatore Ferragamo and spent more than a decade as managing director of the jewelry and watch business ENIGMA founded by his father.

In June 2017, Bulgari founded a jewelry company Giorgio Bulgari SA in Geneva, Switzerland. He designed a vintage engagement ring for Dennis Quaid's engagement.

In July 2020, Bulgari launched the premium ice-cream brand ‘Crema’ in Milan.

References 

Bulgari family
1977 births
Living people